Ushiro-Kesa-Gatame is one of the variations of Kesa-Gatame, a mat hold, listed in The Canon Of Judo.

Escapes 
The main escape from this hold involves bridging and rolling your opponent over your shoulder. Although this hold is inherently vulnerable to this type of reversal, the individual performing the hold can mitigate this vulnerability by placing their trailing foot further back, making it substantially more difficult for their opponent to roll them.

Submissions

Technique history

Included systems 
Lists:
The Canon Of Judo
Judo technique

Similar techniques, variants, and aliases 
English aliases:
Rear scarf hold
Similar:
Kesa-Gatame

Judo technique